Hanbok refers to the traditional clothing of Korea. 
This is a list of Korean clothing including the national costume, hanbok, as well as headgear, footwear, and accessories.

Hanbok

Headgear

Footwear

Accessories

References

https://web.archive.org/web/20091114025453/http://hair.culturecontent.com/index.asp

External links

 
Clothing
Clothing-related lists